The men's 4 × 100 metres relay event at the 1955 International University Sports Week was held in San Sebastián on 12 and 13 August 1955.

Results

Heats

Final

References

Athletics at the 1955 Summer International University Sports Week
1955